St Stephen's Church, Hyson Green is a Church of England church in Hyson Green, Nottingham.

History

St Stephen's was the successor church to St Stephen's Church, Bunker's Hill. It was designed by W. D. Caröe and consecrated by George Ridding, the Bishop of Southwell, in 1898. A mission room and school was designed by Hedley John Price and opened in 1902.

In 1987 it was amalgamated with St Paul's Church, Hyson Green as the joint parish of Hyson Green St Paul's and St Stephen's, Nottingham.

Incumbents

1896 - 1924 Charles Douglas Gordon 
1924 - 1931 Bernard Parker Hall 
1931 - 1956 Jervis Twycross 
1957 - 1983 William Vincent Beckett  
1984 - 1992 Glyn Jones 
1992 - 2001 Graham Burton 
2001 - 2009 Ruth Worsley 
2009 - Current Clive Robert Burrows

Organ

A specification of the organ can be found on the National Pipe Organ Register.

Organists

J. Gordon Wood 1922 - 1928 (afterwards organist of St Matthew's Church, Talbot Street)
Cecil Wyer 1928 - 1931
Cecil T Payne 1936 - 1936
J. Gordon Wood 1936 - 1941 (second appointment)

References

External links
 Southwell and Nottingham DAC Church History Website.

Hyson Green St Stephen
Hyson Green
Hyson Green St Stephen
Religious organizations established in 1896
Organizations disestablished in 1987
Churches completed in 1897
Buildings by W. D. Caröe